The following is a list of libraries in Metro Manila, Philippines.

Major Public Libraries

A public library is "a library or library system that provides unrestricted access to library resources and services free of charge to all the residents of a given community, district, or geographic region, supported wholly or in part by public funds. Because public libraries have a broader mandate than academic libraries and most special libraries, they must develop their collections to reflect diversity." (ODLIS https://products.abc-clio.com/ODLIS/odlis_p.aspx#publiclibrary). A library within or under the government, e.g. a public school or a state college/university, may not be considered a public library since it has a more specific user community to cater to. Public libraries are set up to be managed and funded by the local government for the public's use. Examples of public libraries are congressional district libraries, city libraries, municipal libraries, barangay reading centers (RA 7743).

Privately owned libraries open to the public

Community Libraries, Branch Libraries, and Barangay Reading Centers

Academic libraries

See also
Libraries in the Philippines

Notes

External links
ReadPhilippines.com Pinoy Readers' Community

Metro Manila
 
Metro Manila-related lists
Philippines education-related lists